Bukhtiarabad Domki (Also spelled Bakhtiarabad Domki) is a town in Nasirabad district of Balochistan province in Pakistan.

Populated places in Nasirabad District